Chris Matthew Sciabarra (born February 17, 1960) is an American political theorist based in Brooklyn, New York. He is the author of three scholarly books—Marx, Hayek, and Utopia; Ayn Rand: The Russian Radical; and Total Freedom: Toward a Dialectical Libertarianism—as well as several shorter works. He is also the co-editor, with Mimi Reisel Gladstein, of Feminist Interpretations of Ayn Rand and co-editor with Roger E. Bissell and Edward W. Younkins of The Dialectics of Liberty: Exploring the Context of Human Freedom. His work has focused on topics including Objectivism, libertarianism (particularly the work of Friedrich Hayek and Murray Rothbard), and dialectics.

Life
Sciabarra was a visiting scholar at New York University from 1989 to 2009, where he earned his BA in history (with honors) in 1982; his MA in Politics in 1983; and his PhD in Political Philosophy, Theory, and Methodology in 1988, under the supervision of Bertell Ollman. In 1999 he became the co-founder and co-editor of the biannual Journal of Ayn Rand Studies, which has been published by Penn State University Press since 2013, and belongs to Liberty and Power, a group weblog at the History News Network.

He is the author of a trilogy of books on dialectics and libertarianism. The second of these, published in 1995, is Ayn Rand: The Russian Radical, which explores Ayn Rand's college influences and intellectual roots—particularly the role of Rand's philosophy teacher, philosopher Nicholas Onufrievich Lossky—and argued that Rand's philosophical method was dialectical in nature. In 2013, Pennsylvania State University Press published a second expanded edition of Ayn Rand: The Russian Radical, which includes a new preface, three new appendices (Appendices I and II are "The Rand Transcript" and "The Rand Transcript, Revisited," first published in The Journal of Ayn Rand Studies, and Appendix III constitutes a response to Shoshana Milgram, a recent critic of Sciabarra's historical work.  The expanded second edition also includes an expanded section in Chapter XII, "The Predatory State," entitled "The Welfare-Warfare State," which explores Rand's radical critique of US foreign policy). For a comparison of the two editions see the links on his Notablog 

Sciabarra is openly gay. He is of Sicilian and Greek ancestry.

Reviews of Ayn Rand: The Russian Radical
David M. Brown writes: "Much to my surprise the author of Ayn Rand: The Russian Radical, a comprehensive new study of Rand's thought and its genesis in Russian culture, has persuaded me that something called 'dialectics' is integral to Ayn Rand's philosophic approach and crucial to its success. Russian Radical is a different kind of look at Ayn Rand, a full-fledged 'hermeneutic' on the contours, development, and interpretation of her thought."

According to Lester H. Hunt: "It is indicative of the interest of this book that I have so far engaged in an argument with it instead of saying how good I think it is on the whole. Among other things, it is an excellent synthesis of the Objectivist literature, both the works of Rand and those of her immediate successors. Sciabarra's mastery of enormous amounts of material is almost literally incredible. He also manages to break entirely new ground on several different issues."

While James G. Lennox thoroughly rejects the author's historical conclusions, and he recommends against construing Rand's method of challenging dichotomies or "false alternatives" as "dialectical," he also writes, "[i]ts author has an encyclopedic familiarity with the writings of Ayn Rand and with virtually everyone who has advocated, commented on, or written critically about Objectivism. [...]. He is the first of her commentators to explore the intellectual milieu of Rand's early, formative years, providing a deeper appreciation for her occasional scathing remarks about Russian culture as she had experienced it. All of this material is discussed, and exhaustively referenced, in the interests of providing a comprehensive analysis of Objectivism, not merely as a philosophical system, but as a philosophical and cultural movement." Virtually the same review ran as "Reaching for Roots" in the February 1996 issue of Reason.

John Ridpath, a director of the Ayn Rand Institute, has argued that The Russian Radical is postmodern and deconstructionist in its overall orientation, that it is a "worthless product" of contemporary academia, and that on the whole it was "preposterous in its thesis, destructive in its purpose, and tortuously numbing in its content."

Bibliography

Dialectics and Liberty trilogy

Edited works
 With Mimi Reisel Gladstein. 
 With Roger E. Bissell and Edward W. Younkins.

Monographs

Dissertation
 Toward a Radical Critique of Utopianism (1988)

References

External links
 Dialectics & Liberty Home Page
 Notablog Online Journal
 The Journal of Ayn Rand Studies

1960 births
Living people
21st-century American male writers
21st-century American non-fiction writers
American libertarians
American male bloggers
American bloggers
American people of Greek descent
American people of Italian descent
American political writers
Gay feminists
American gay writers
Individualist feminists
Libertarian theorists
Male feminists
Neo-Objectivists
New York University alumni
Objectivism scholars
Writers from Brooklyn